Aydrea Walden is an American screenwriter and actress best known for the series Black Girl in a Big Dress.

Walden has written for the series Yin Yang Yo! and ChalkZone.  She also created, written, and starred in the Webby Award-nominated series Black Girl in a Big Dress. She has worked in the animation department on the films The Croods, Home, and How to Train Your Dragon: The Hidden World.  Walden also performs, appearing in her one-woman show, The Oreo Experience: A Total Whitey Trapped in a Black Chick’s Body, the short film Sci-Fi 60, and an episode of The Mandalorian. She has also contributed episodes for Thomas & Friends: All Engines Go. 

Walden is also a costumer and part of the inspiration for Black Girl in a Big Dress was the lack of representation of African-Americans in costuming. Walden has stated that “There’s still an assumption that ‘black’ stories must be very serious or very dramatic, or about struggle, but black people also have fun and play around and love romantic comedies and do all the goofy things that white people do. Black Girl in a Big Dress has fun with one of those goofy things.”

In 2020, the Science Fiction and Fantasy Writers of America named Walden toastmaster for the annual Nebula Awards, which were moved on-line due to the COVID-19 pandemic.

Walden was a Chips Quinn Scholar and earned a degree in journalism from the University of Texas at Austin. Walden has worked as a writer for the Yakima Herald-Republic.

References

External links
 
 Black Girl in a Big Dress

Living people
American film actresses
American television actresses
American voice actresses
American web series actresses
21st-century American actresses
Web series producers
American women screenwriters
21st-century American screenwriters
Year of birth missing (living people)